Pearcea sprucei is a species of Gesneriaceae that is native to Bolivia, Ecuador, and Peru.

References

External links
 
 

sprucei